"Suck My Kiss" is a song by American rock band Red Hot Chili Peppers. It was released as the third single from their fifth studio album, Blood Sugar Sex Magik. "Suck My Kiss" was released as an airplay single in the United States in 1991 and as a physical single in Australia and New Zealand the following year, reaching the top 10 in the two latter countries and peaking at number 15 on the US Billboard Modern Rock Tracks chart.

A music video, released on May 1, 1992, was made for the song using footage from the Funky Monks documentary directed by Gavin Bowden. It also featured shots in shades of red of the American army returning from the Gulf War, revealed by Anthony Kiedis on the audio commentary in the band Greatest Videos compilation. The song was included on the band's Greatest Hits compilation.

Track listings
US promo CD
 "Suck My Kiss" (radio version) – 3:35
 "Suck My Kiss" (album version) – 3:35

Australian limited-edition CD and cassette single
 "Suck My Kiss"
 "Search and Destroy"
 "Fela's Cock"

Personnel
Red Hot Chili Peppers
 Anthony Kiedis – vocals
 Flea – bass
 John Frusciante – guitar
 Chad Smith – drums

Additional musicians
 Brendan O'Brien – Hammond B3 organ

Charts

Weekly charts

Year-end charts

Certifications

In media and popular culture
The song was voted number five in a Rolling Stone readers' poll on Red Hot Chili Peppers songs.

The song appears in episodes of Beavis and Butt-head and Hindsight, as well as the video games Guitar Hero III: Legends of Rock and NBA 2K15 "Yakkem Trailer" and the latter's soundtrack album. Along with the rest of the Blood Sugar Sex Magik album, the song was formerly a downloadable track in the Rock Band series. A remixed instrumental based on the song is often used as royalty free production music.

A line was used in the Japanese TV show Tamori Club, in a segment called "Soramimi Hour", in which non-Japanese songs are  interpreted into Japanese, according to phonetics. The line "Should have been, could have been, would have been..." from the first verse was interpreted as 白便　黒便　和田勉 (Shiro ben, kuro ben, Wada Ben'), which translates to: "White excrement, black excrement, Ben Wada").

The song was covered by Richard Cheese and Lounge Against the Machine on his 2000 album, Lounge Against the Machine.

References

Songs about kissing
Red Hot Chili Peppers songs
1991 songs
1992 singles
Song recordings produced by Rick Rubin
Songs written by Flea (musician)
Songs written by John Frusciante
Songs written by Anthony Kiedis
Songs written by Chad Smith
Warner Records singles